Marabese Design (originally as Studio Marabese) is a family-owned design firm, created in 1984.

Headquartered in Cerro Maggiore near Milano, Italy, the firm was led by founder Luciano Marabese and two sons, Riccardo and Roberto Marabese, specializing in motorcycle design.

The company's project portfolio includes the design of boats, ultralight vehicles, and other two and four-wheeled vehicles – as well as architectural and industrial design. Design, consultancy, research, and development services are also a part of Marabese business activities. They have been hired by Piaggio, Moto Guzzi, Moto Morini, Aprilia, Triumph Motorcycles Ltd, Gilera, Yamaha Motor Company, Bajaj, Daelim, and Qingqi.

List of designs

 Aprilia Atlantic
 Aprilia Pegaso 650
 Gilera Runner
 Gilera Nexus
 Gilera Typhoon / NRG
 Gilera KZ
 Gilera RC
 Moto Guzzi V11
 Moto Guzzi V10 Centauro
 Moto Guzzi Breva 750 – Breva V1100
 Moto Guzzi Griso
 Moto Guzzi Norge
 Moto Morini Corsaro 1200
 Moto Morini 9
 Moto Morini Granpasso
 Piaggio Vespa Gran Turismo 200
 Piaggio X8
 Piaggio MP3 (specifically only the technology)
 Piaggio Zip
 Piaggio Sfera
 Piaggio Exagon
 Quadro 350D/S
 Triumph Urban Daytona
 Triumph Tiger 1050
 Triumph Speed Triple
 Yamaha MT-03

References

Engineering companies of Italy
Motorcycle designers
Moto Guzzi designers